

Semifinals

England vs Australia

In the best World Cup performance to date by a bowler, Gary Gilmour (6/14) took six wickets as England were bowled all out for 93 (all out, 36.2 overs), after falling to 37/7. Australia initially suffered a collapse just as dramatic, falling to 39/6, before Gary Gilmour (28 from 28 balls, 5 fours) brought them home in a fantastic all-round performance.

New Zealand vs West Indies

The West Indies won the toss and sent New Zealand in to bat first. New Zealand batted well against the bowling at first, reaching 98/1. However, when captain Glenn Turner (36 from 74 balls, 3 fours) and Geoff Howarth (51 from 93 balls, 3 fours) fell, breaking a second-wicket partnership of 90 runs, New Zealand lost 9/60 to fall to 158 (all out, 52.2 overs). The West Indies responded, with Alvin Kallicharan (72 from 92 balls, 7 fours, 1 six) and Gordon Greenidge (55 from 95 balls, 9 fours, 1 six) sharing a second-wicket partnership of 125 runs that brought the West Indies to their target.

Final

In the final, the West Indies beat Australia by 17 runs, after an accomplished innings from captain Clive Lloyd (102 from 85 balls, 12 fours, 2 sixes).  The Australian innings was marked by top-order batsmen being run out when going for runs after misfields.  A total of five of their team were run out, three by Vivian Richards. There was no 'Man of the Series' awarded in 1975.

References

External links
 Cricket World Cup 1975 from Cricinfo

Knockout stage